The 2001–02 Gamma Ethniki was the 19th season since the official establishment of the third tier of Greek football in 1983. Kerkyra was crowned champion, thus winning promotion to Beta Ethniki. Kassandra, Fostiras, Kavala and Atromitos also won promotion due to expansion of Beta Ethniki from 14 to 16 teams.

Panelefsiniakos, Panetolikos and Apollon Krya Vrysi were relegated to Delta Ethniki.

League table

References

Third level Greek football league seasons
3
Greece